This is a list of members of the South Australian House of Assembly from 1887 to 1890, as elected at the 1887 colonial election:

 Gumeracha MHA Robert Dalrymple Ross died on 27 December 1887. Lancelot Stirling won the resulting by-election on 12 May 1888.
 Victoria MHA Daniel Livingston died on 30 September 1888. John James Osman won the resulting by-election on 1 November.
 Stanley MHA Edward William Hawker resigned on 28 May 1889. Peter Paul Gillen won the resulting by-election on 25 June.

References

Members of South Australian parliaments by term
19th-century Australian politicians